News (ニュース) is the fifth extended play by Japanese rock band Tokyo Jihen. It was released on April 8, 2020 through EMI Records. The album was produced by the band and Japanese recording engineer Uni Inoue. On January 1, 2020, the single "Erabarezaru Kokumin" was released along with the tour "Live Tour 2020 News Flash", which began February 29 and ended April 9. The tour started on the same day they dissolved on February 29, 2012, a leap day.

Track listing
All lyrics written by Ringo Sheena and all tracks arranged by Tokyo Jihen.

All official international English titles from Tidal.

Personnel
Credits adapted from Tidal.

Tokyo Jihen
 Ringo Sheena – lead vocals
 Ichiyō Izawa – keyboards, vocals
 Ukigumo – guitar, vocals
 Seiji Kameda – bass
 Toshiki Hata – drums, vocals

Additional personnel
 Uni Inoue – record engineering, mix engineering

Charts and sales

Charts

Sales

References

External links 
Tokyo Jihen Discography

Tokyo Jihen albums
2020 EPs
EMI Records EPs